José Carlos Schiavinato (12 September 1954 – 13 April 2021) was a Brazilian politician and engineer.

Biography
A member of the Progressistas, he served as Mayor of Toledo from 2005 to 2013. He was also a Member of the Chamber of Deputies for Paraná from 2015 until his death from COVID-19 in Brasília on 13 April 2021, at the age of 66.

References

1954 births
2021 deaths
21st-century Brazilian politicians
21st-century Brazilian engineers
People from Paraná (state)
Members of the Chamber of Deputies (Brazil) from Paraná
Progressistas politicians
Mayors of places in Brazil
Deaths from the COVID-19 pandemic in Federal District (Brazil)